Rhinoestrus is a genus of flies belonging to the family Oestridae.

The species of this genus are found in Southern Africa.

Species:

Rhinoestrus antidorcitis 
Rhinoestrus giraffae 
Rhinoestrus hippopotami 
Rhinoestrus latifrons 
Rhinoestrus nivarleti 
Rhinoestrus phacochoeri 
Rhinoestrus purpureus 
Rhinoestrus steyni 
Rhinoestrus tshernyshevi 
Rhinoestrus usbekistanicus 
Rhinoestrus vanzyli

References

Oestridae
Brachycera genera